Henry Byron Warner (born Henry Byron Lickfold, 26 October 1876 – 21 December 1958) was an English film and theatre actor. He was popular during the silent era and played Jesus Christ in The King of Kings. In later years, he successfully moved into supporting roles and appeared in numerous films directed by Frank Capra. Warner's most recognizable role to modern audiences is Mr. Gower in the perennially shown film It's a Wonderful Life, directed by Capra. He appeared in the original 1937 version of  Lost Horizon as Chang, for which he was nominated for the Academy Award for Best Supporting Actor.

Early life
Born in St John's Wood, London, England in 1876, H. B. Warner was educated at Bedford School. His father, Charles Warner, was an actor, and although Henry initially thought about studying medicine, he eventually performed on the stage. He had an older sister, Grace Warner (1873-1925), who was a stage actress and manager.

Stage
Warner's stage debut came in It's Never Too Late to Mend when he was 21. He acted in several plays before coming to the United States for the 1905–1906 season. His Broadway credits include Silence (1924), You and I (1922), Danger (1921), Sleeping Partners (1918), Out There (1917), and Blackbirds (1912).

Film
Warner began his film career in silent films in 1914 when he debuted in The Lost Paradise. He played lead roles in the silent era and also appeared in numerous Broadway plays. His greatest success was the role of Jesus in Cecil B. DeMille's silent epic The King of Kings in 1927. He received good reviews for this role, but with the advent of sound era, he turned toward supporting roles, mostly because of his age. He usually was cast in dignified roles in numerous films of the 1930s and 1940s. He played in the 1930 version of Liliom (as the Heavenly Magistrate), in Five Star Final (1931, as Michael Townsend), in Grand Canary (1934, as Dr. Ismay), and the 1935 version of  A Tale of Two Cities as Gabelle. He portrayed the strict judge in Mr. Deeds Goes to Town (1936). He appeared in the original 1937 version of  Lost Horizon as Chang, for which he was nominated for the Academy Award for Best Supporting Actor.

Among his later films were You Can't Take It With You (1938), Mr. Smith Goes to Washington (1939), The Rains Came (1939), and The Corsican Brothers (1941). In It's a Wonderful Life (1946), he played an atypical role as the drunken druggist. Occasionally, Warner was seen in sinister roles as in the 1941 film version of The Devil and Daniel Webster, in which he played the ghost of John Hathorne. Also that year, he played the villainous role of Mr. Carrington in Topper Returns. He had a cameo in Sunset Boulevard (1950), directed by Billy Wilder, in which he played himself, playing cards with some other former silent film stars, including Buster Keaton and Anna Q. Nilsson. He had a cameo role in Cecil B DeMille's The Ten Commandments (1956). His last film role was an uncredited cameo in Darby's Rangers (1958).

Personal life
Warner was married twice, first to the former Mrs. F. R. Hamlin, who died in 1914, and from 1915 until 1933 to Marguerite L. 'Rita' Stanwood. On 21 December 1958, Warner died in Los Angeles, California of a heart attack, and is interred in a private vault at the Chapel of the Pines Crematory in Los Angeles, California.

For his contributions to the motion picture industry, Warner has a star on the Hollywood Walk of Fame at 6600 Hollywood Boulevard.

Filmography

The Lost Paradise (1914) as Reuben Warren
The Ghost Breaker (1914) as Warren Jarvis
The Market of Vain Desire (1916) as John Armstrong
Shell 43 (1916) as William Berner
 The Raiders (1916) as Scott Wells
The Beggar of Cawnpore (1916) as Dr. Robert Lowndes
The Vagabond Prince (1916) as Prince Torio
 The Danger Trail (1917) as John Howland
 Wrath (1917) as Feodor
 The Seventh Sin (1917) as The Grand Duke
 God's Man (1917) as Arnold L'Hommedieu
 For a Woman's Honor (1919) as Captain Clyde Mannering
The Man Who Turned White (1919) as Captain Rand
A Fugitive from Matrimony (1919) as Stephen Van Courtlandt
Haunting Shadows (1919) as John Glenarm
The Pagan God (1919) as Bruce Winthrop
 The Gray Wolf's Ghost (1919) as Doctor West
The White Dove (1920) as Sylvester Lanyon
One Hour Before Dawn (1920) as George Clayton
Felix O'Day (1920) as Felix O'Day
Uncharted Channels (1920) as Timothy Webb Jr
Dice of Destiny (1920) as Jimmy Doyle
When We Were 21 (1921) as Richard Carewe
Zaza (1923) as Bernard Dufresne
Is Love Everything? (1924) as Jordan Southwick
Whispering Smith (1926) as 'Whispering Smith'
Silence (1926) as Jim Warren
The King of Kings (1927) as Jesus 
Sorrell and Son (1927) as Stephen Sorrell
French Dressing (1927) as Phillip Grey
Man-Made Women (1928) as Jules Moret
Romance of a Rogue (1928)
The Naughty Duchess (1928) as Duke de St. Maclou
Conquest (1928) as James Farnham
The Doctor's Secret (1929) as Richard Garson
Stark Mad (1929) as Prof. Dangerfield
The Divine Lady (1929) as Sir William Hamilton
The Trial of Mary Dugan (1929) as District Attorney Galway
The Gamblers (1929) as James Darwin
The Argyle Case (1929) as Hurley
The Show of Shows (1929) as The Victim - Guillotine Sequence
Tiger Rose (1929) as Dr. Cusick
Wedding Rings (1929) as Lewis Dike
The Green Goddess (1930) as Major Crespin
The Furies (1930) as Oliver Bedlow
The Second Floor Mystery (1930) as Inspector Bray
Wild Company (1930) as Henry Grayson
On Your Back (1930) as Raymond Pryor
Liliom (1930) as Chief Magistrate
The Princess and the Plumber (1930) as Prince Conrad of Daritzia
A Woman of Experience (1931) as Major Hugh Schmidt
The Reckless Hour (1931) as Walter Nichols
Five Star Final (1931) as Michael Townsend
Expensive Women (1931) as Melville Raymond
Charlie Chan's Chance (1932) as Inspector Fife
The Menace (1932) as Inspector Tracy
A Woman Commands (1932) as Col. Stradimirovitsch
Unholy Love (1932) as Dr. Daniel Gregory
 Cross-Examination as Gerald Waring
Tom Brown of Culver (1932) as Dr. Brown
The Crusader (1932) as Phillip Brandon
The Phantom of Crestwood (1932) as Priam Andes
The Son-Daughter (1932) as Sin Kai
Supernatural (1933) as Dr. Carl Houston
Jennie Gerhardt (1933) as William Gerhardt
Christopher Bean (1933) as Maxwell Davenport
Sorrell and Son (1933) as Captain Stephen Sorrell
Grand Canary (1934) as Dr. Ismay
In Old Santa Fe (1934) as Charlie Miller
Behold My Wife (1934) as Hubert Carter
Night Alarm (1934) as Henry B. Smith
Born to Gamble (1935) as Carter Mathews
A Tale of Two Cities (1935) as Gabelle
The Garden Murder Case (1936) as Major Fenwicke-Ralston
Rose of the Rancho (1936) as Don Pasqual Castro
Moonlight Murder (1936) as Godfrey Chiltern
Mr. Deeds Goes to Town (1936) as Judge May
Blackmailer (1936) as Michael Rankin
Along Came Love (1936) as Dr. Martin
Lost Horizon (1937) as Chang
Our Fighting Navy (1937) as British Consul Brent
Victoria the Great (1937) as Lord Melbourne
Girl of the Golden West (1938) as Father Sienna
The Adventures of Marco Polo (1938) as Chen Tsu
Kidnapped (1938) as Angus Rankeillor
The Toy Wife (1938) as Victor Brigard
Bulldog Drummond in Africa (1938) as Col. J.A. Nielsen
Army Girl (1938) as Col. Armstrong
You Can't Take It With You (1938) as Ramsay
Arrest Bulldog Drummond (1938) as Colonel Nielsen
Let Freedom Ring (1939) as Rutledge
Bulldog Drummond's Secret Police (1939) as Colonel Nielson
The Gracie Allen Murder Case (1939) as Richard Lawrence
Bulldog Drummond's Bride (1939) as Colonel Nielson
Nurse Edith Cavell (1939) as Hugh Gibson
The Rains Came (1939) as Maharajah
Mr. Smith Goes to Washington (1939) as Senator Agnew
New Moon (1940) as Father Michel
Topper Returns (1941) as Mr. Carrington
The Devil and Daniel Webster (1941) as Justice John Hathorne
City of Missing Girls (1941) as Captain McVeigh
South of Tahiti (1941) as High Chief Kawalima
The Corsican Brothers (1941) as Dr. Enrico Paoli
Crossroads (1942) as Prosecuting Attorney
A Yank in Libya (1942) as Herbert Forbes
The Boss of Big Town (1942) as Jeffrey Moore
Hitler's Children (1943) as The Bishop
Women in Bondage (1943) as Pastor Renz
Action in Arabia (1944) as Abdul El Rashid
Enemy of Women (1944) as Col. Eberhart Brandt
Faces in the Fog (1944) as Defense Attorney Rankins
Rogues' Gallery (1944) as Prof. Reynolds
Captain Tugboat Annie (1945) as Judge Abbott
Strange Impersonation (1946) as Dr. Mansfield
Gentleman Joe Palooka (1946) as Sen. McCarden
It's a Wonderful Life (1946) as Mr. Gower
Driftwood (1947) as Rev. J. Hollingsworth
High Wall (1947) as Mr. Slocum
The Prince of Thieves (1948) as Gilbert Head
The Judge Steps Out (1949) as Chief Justice Hayes
El Paso (1949) as Judge Fletcher
Hellfire (1949) as Brother Joseph
Sunset Boulevard (1950) as himself 
The First Legion (1951) as Fr. Jose Sierra
 Savage Drums (1951) as Maou
Here Comes the Groom (1951) as Uncle Elihu
Journey Into Light (1951) as Wiz - the Wino
The Ten Commandments (1956) as Amminadab

See also
 List of actors with Academy Award nominations

References

External links

Photographs and literature

1876 births
1958 deaths
English male film actors
English male silent film actors
English male stage actors
People from St John's Wood
20th-century English male actors
Burials at Chapel of the Pines Crematory
Male actors from London
People educated at Bedford School
British expatriate male actors in the United States